Olga Mistereggen (1 January 1894 – 3 September 1970) was a Norwegian politician for the Labour Party.

She hailed from Ytre Rendal. She served as a deputy representative to the Parliament of Norway from Hedmark during the term 1950–1953. In total she met during 42 days of parliamentary session. She was also deputy leader of Hedmark Farmers and Smallholders Union.

References

1894 births
1970 deaths
Labour Party (Norway) politicians
Deputy members of the Storting
Hedmark politicians
Women members of the Storting
20th-century Norwegian women politicians
20th-century Norwegian politicians